Jacqueline M. Davies styled Her Honour Judge Jacqueline Davies (born 21 May 1948) is a Circuit Judge, working in the North Eastern region of the UK. She was appointed on 29 June 1993.
Her Honour Judge Jacqueline Davies died peacefully on
April 18, 2019, in Wheatfields Hospice, aged 70 years.

Notable Decisions

Twitter Joke Trial 
On 11 November 2010 Judge Jacqueline Davies, sitting with two magistrates, refused an appeal against the verdict of the "Twitter Joke Trial", from Paul Chambers who had posted a message on Twitter saying:

Chambers was appealing his conviction for "sending a public electronic message that was grossly offensive or of an indecent, obscene or menacing character contrary to the Communications Act 2003" at Doncaster magistrates court

When Judge Davies heard the appeal in Doncaster Crown Court she judged that the tweet was "obviously menacing" and that Chambers must have known that it might be taken seriously. She upheld the £1000 fine, and ordered that he pay an extra £2000 in legal costs.

Many members of Twitter registered their disapproval of the judgement, and Stephen Fry offered to pay the defendant's legal bill.

Judge Davies' decision was reversed on appeal in the High Court by decision dated 27 July 2012. The 13 page judgment by Lord Chief Justice Lord Judge, stated:

Personal life
Judge Davies was married to Judge Paul Clark who died on 7 October 2008 

In 2009 Judge Davies took part in a charity walk across the Sinai Desert in memory of her husband and to raise money for Prostate UK and Wellbeing of Women.

References

20th-century English judges
Living people
Place of birth missing (living people)
English women judges
1948 births
21st-century English judges